Richhill is a large village and townland in County Armagh, Northern Ireland. It lies between Armagh and Portadown. It had a population of 2,821 people in the 2011 Census.

Originally named Legacorry, it takes its name from Edward Richardson, who built the manor house around which the village grew.

Origins
At the beginning of the 1600s, the area of Richhill had long been part of the Irish Gaelic territory of Oneilland. In 1610, as part of the Plantation of Ulster, the land was granted to Englishman Francis Sacherevall. His granddaughter Ann married Edward Richardson, who was an English officer, Member of Parliament for County Armagh from 1655 to 1696, and High Sheriff of Armagh in 1665.

Around 1660, Richardson built a manor house on the site that would become Richhill, and in 1664 it was reported that there were twenty houses there. At this time, the village was named Legacorry, after the townland in which it sprang up. Legacorry comes .

In Thomas Molyneux's Journey to the North (1708), the townland appears as "Legacorry, a pretty village belonging to Mr Richardson". It gradually became known as Richardson's Hill and this was shortened to Rich Hill. The original gates to the manor house were wrought by two brothers named Thornberry from Falmouth, Cornwall and were erected in 1745. In 1936 they were moved to the entrance of Hillsborough Castle.

Village regeneration
In 2012, it was announced that work would begin on a £1.5 million regeneration scheme, which will transform the village and involve the restoration of about 20 buildings. The Richhill Partnership began work in 2013 with the concealing of overhead wires and cables on streets within the conservation area, and building restoration work began in early March.

Transport
The Ulster Railway opened Richhill railway station on the line between Belfast and Armagh on 1 March 1848. It was part of the Great Northern Railway from 1876. The Government of Northern Ireland forced the GNR Board to close the line on 1 October 1957.

There are proposals to reopen railway lines in Northern Ireland, including the line to Armagh.

Sport
 Broomhill F.C.
 Richhill F.C.
 Richhill Recreation Centre
 Orchard Wheelers Cycling Club
 Armagh and Richhill Beagles
 Lodge Equine Stables and Pony Club Centre
 Intouch Equestrian and Richhill Pony Club Centre
 Richhill Raiders Volleyball Club

Churches
 St Matthew's Church of Ireland
 Richhill Methodist Church
 Richhill Presbyterian Church
 Quakers, The Society of Friends Richhill
 Richhill Elim Church
 Richhill Evangelical Presbyterian Church
 Grace Community Church

Education
Hardy Memorial Primary School

Districts
 Annareagh
 Ballyleny
 Ballynahinch
 Corcreevy
 Crewcat
 Drumard (Jones)
 Liskyborough
 Maynooth
 Mullaletragh
 Rich Hill Town
 Rich Hill or Legacorry
 Rockmacreeny
 Shewis

Notable people
 Richard Best, judge
 William Richardson, Member of Parliament
 Max Clendinning, architect

Demographics

2011 Census
It had a population of 2,821 people (1,076 households) in the 2011 Census. Of these: 

 21.1% were aged under 16 years and 78.9% were aged 16 and over
 49.6% of the population were male and 50.4% were female
 6.4% were from a Catholic background and 88% were from a Protestant background
 3.59% of people aged 16–74 were unemployed

2001 census
The NI Statistics and Research Agency (NISRA) classifies Richhill as an intermediate settlement (i.e. with population between 2,250 and 4,500 people).
On Census day (29 April 2011) there were 2,818 people living in Richhill. Of these:
 26.8% were aged under 16 years and 73.2% were aged 16 and over
 49.8% of the population were male and 50.3% were female
 3.4% were from a Catholic background and 94.6% were from a Protestant background
 1.9% of people aged 16–74 were unemployed

See also

 List of towns and villages in Northern Ireland

References

External links
 Richhill online

Villages in County Armagh